This is a list of current and former Roman Catholic churches in the Roman Catholic Diocese of Buffalo.

Buffalo

Current churches

Former churches

Outside Buffalo

References

 
Buffalo